West Felton is a civil parish in Shropshire, England.  It contains 47 listed buildings that are recorded in the National Heritage List for England.  Of these, three are listed at Grade II*, the middle of the three grades, and the others are at Grade II, the lowest grade.  The parish contains the village of West Felton and smaller settlements, and is otherwise rural.  Most of the listed buildings are houses and associated structures, farmhouses and farm buildings, the earliest of which are timber framed.  The Montgomery Canal runs through the parish and the listed buildings associated with it are a roving bridge, a warehouse, and a barge house.  The other listed buildings include a church and items in the churchyard, a well, two country houses and associated structures, a road bridge, three milestones, and a disused railway station and goods shed, 


Key

Buildings

References

Citations

Sources

Lists of buildings and structures in Shropshire